Nebularia dondani is a species of sea snail, a marine gastropod mollusc in the family Mitridae, the miters or miter snails.

Description
This attractively-patterned species attains a size of 45 mm.

Distribution
Uncommon: in deep water off the Philippines.

References

dondani
Gastropods described in 1985